Westfriedhof, which in German means "west(ern) cemetery", can refer to:

Westfriedhof (Munich)
Westfriedhof (Munich U-Bahn), U-Bahn station in Munich named after the cemetery
Westfriedhof (Cologne)